Ezra William Bartlett (26 September 1861 – 16 March 1942) played first-class cricket for Somerset in 1894 and 1895. He also played for Somerset in 1886 and 1889, when the county team was not considered first-class. He was born at Doncaster, Yorkshire and died at Taunton, Somerset.

Bartlett was a lower-order batsman, but it is not known whether he batted right- or left-handed. In a non-first-class match against Staffordshire in 1889 and in his first first-class match in 1894 against Kent he kept wicket. But in five other games in 1895 he played as a batsman, though he bowled six overs of unknown style in one match. His highest score was 40, made in the second innings of the home match against Hampshire in 1895, which Somerset lost narrowly.

His obituary in Wisden Cricketers' Almanack in 1943 records that he was employed by the Post Office and that he was a prominent player and administrator at Taunton Cricket Club.

References

1861 births
1942 deaths
English cricketers
Somerset cricketers